West Hartlepool War Memorial or Victory Square War Memorial or Victoria Square Cenotaph is a war memorial in Hartlepool, County Durham, England commemorating those from West Hartlepool who died in World War I and World War II. The war memorial, created in the 1920s, is located on Victoria Road in Hartlepool's Victory Square. The square was created for this monument.

Victory Square
There was much deliberation about the selection of the site for the memorial or cenotaph. The idea was for the war memorial to be placed in a public square, which would face municipal buildings on the north side and be balanced with public buildings on the south side. Victory Square, a large area in the center of town, was established for that purpose. The mayor of West Hartlepool from 1915 to 1917, Alderman Charles Macfarlane, introduced the idea of using land already designated for municipal buildings, previously "The Armoury Field", for a World War I memorial. Later approved at a public meeting, the cost was estimated at £150,000. It was also proposed that housing be created for seniors and the disabled as a related project. Donations came in for Cottage Homes "in connection with the war memorial", such as that by J. W. Crosby, partner in one of the towns shipping firms, Crosby, Magee & Co. who gave £5.000.

World War I Memorial 
Bronze bas-relief of laurel wreaths are located at the top of the monument on each side. Another wreath is situated near the bottom with the town coat of arms and the motto "E Mare ex Industria" ("Industry comes from the Sea"). There are also bronze wreaths on the pedestal.

A competition for the memorial design was managed by architect Ernest Newton, RA, who was then President of Royal Institute of British Architects. The winner was George J Coombs of Aberdeen. Coombs' design was apparently complete by 1921, when he died, and his plans were carried out by George Bennett Mitchell, Vice-President of the Institute of Scottish Architects. The memorial was built by D. G. Somerville and Company of London and A Fyfe and Son. It was cast at H. H. Martyn and Company. It is classified as a grade II monument.

On 11 October 1923 the memorial was to be unveiled by the Earl of Durham (Frederick Lambton, 4th Earl of Durham), but he fell ill and his brother, Brigadier-General Charles Lambton performed the unveiling. It was dedicated by the Bishop of Durham.

Inscriptions
The north elevation bears the arms of West Hartlepool within a wreath. Located on the top of the obelisks' pedestal is the leading inscription "The Great War 1914–1919" followed by the inscription derived from the King George V's message to the next of kin of the dead of the British Empire,In grateful remembrance of the men of this town who at their country's call left all that was dear to them to hazard their lives that others might live in freedom. Their name liveth for evermore.

The southern elevation contains the words "THINE O LORD / IS THE VICTORY" surmounted by a cross.

World War II pillars
Each of the four-sided pillars is mounted with a bronze plaque containing the name of the fallen. A tree was planted between each of the pillars. The pillars were unveiled by Father David Coxon of St. Joseph's Roman Catholic Church, Reverend Tony Whipp of St. Aidan's Church and, representing Seafarers, Ken Cornford.

Memorial responsibility
The responsibility for maintenance and upkeep of the memorial resides with the Hartlepool Borough Council's Neighborhood Services department. In 2008 restoration work was completed to clean and restore the stonework and plaques, which included resolving staining of the patina.

See also
 Raid on Scarborough, Hartlepool and Whitby – World War I bombing of West Hartlepool
 Redheugh Gardens War Memorial – another war memorial in Hartlepool

Notes

References

Further reading
 "Respect for Hartlepool war memorial impressed on youngsters." The Northern Echo: Hartlepool News. 2 November 2009.

External links
West Hartlepool War Memorial (detailed information and photograph)
West Hartlepool War Memorial (honour roll and photographs)
The Armoury, Victoria Road / War Memorial – Forum 3 January 2010
 Maps
Satellite view of the memorial 
 Map that shows both Hartlepool memorials Map with: A = West Hartlepool WM – B = Redheugh Gardens WM
 Images
West Hartlepool War Memorial
West Hartlepool War Memorial
West Hartlepool War Memorial
The Armoury, Victoria Road, c. 1930
War Memorials Trust

British military memorials and cemeteries
Buildings and structures in Hartlepool
Buildings and structures completed in 1923
World War I memorials in England
World War II memorials in England
Monuments and memorials in County Durham
Grade II listed buildings in County Durham